Schiedea verticillata, known as the Devils Slide schiedea or Nihoa carnation, is an endangered species of plant in the family Caryophyllaceae, endemic to the island of Nihoa in the Northwestern Hawaiian Islands, where it was discovered in 1923 by the Tanager Expedition. It has been listed as endangered since 1996.

The flowers are petal-less, have ten stamens and 4-5 styles. The plant estivates, dying back to the fleshy perennial roots during the dry season. Less than 400 individual plants survive in two of Nihoa's rocky valleys, but the population has remained stable. How this plant is pollinated is not known. Even though there are very few individuals surviving, the carnation can avoid inbreeding, a problem that threatens fellow Nihoan plant Amaranthus brownii, because this carnation has the highest genetic diversity of its genus.

Notes

References

External links

Schiedea verticillata F.Br.. Hawaii Biological Survey. Bishop Museum.  Retrieved May 20, 2011.

verticillata
Endemic flora of Nihoa
Plants described in 1931
Tanager Expedition
Taxa named by Forest B.H. Brown